Dubliany is a city in Lviv Raion, Lviv Oblast (region) of Ukraine and a suburb of Lviv ( away). It belongs to Lviv urban hromada, one of the hromadas of Ukraine. Population: . 

Located in the northern side of Lviv, the city's main landmark is the Agrarian University which was established on 9 January 1856 by Halych Economic Society during the Second Polish Republic when Dubliany as a village was part of Lwow Voivodeship as Dublany Agricultural Academy with the only existing Polish-language agricultural academy. In 1919 the academy became part of the Lviv Polytechnic as its agrarian and forestry department. In 1930–33 in Dubliany studied Stepan Bandera and due to the fact, in the university exists Bandera memorial museum.

After World War II Polish ethnic residents of Dubliany were forced to leave the village, and move to the Recovered Territories (see Polish population transfers (1944–46)). Most of them settled in former German village Drachenbrunn near Wroclaw in Silesia. They renamed the village into Dublany (since 1947 - Wojnow, now a district of Wroclaw). 

The local Roman Catholic kosciol (Polish church) that was the first known religious building in village built in 1885–1890, since 1990 has been passed to the Ukrainian Autocephalous Orthodox Church. During the Soviet period the temple was used as a sports gym for the agricultural institute. The first Ukrainian Greek Catholic Church, Dormition of the Theotokos, was built in Dubliany only in 1912 and for long period of time local Greek-Catholic population traveled to the neighboring village (about 2 km) of Malekhiv.

In 1910 in Dubliany was built a train station on a railroad Lviv–Kivertsi (Lwow–Kiwerce).

In 1967 the village was granted the status of urban type settlement. In 1978 Dubliany were granted the status of city.

Until 18 July 2020, Dubliany belonged to Zhovkva Raion. The raion was abolished in July 2020 as part of the administrative reform of Ukraine, which reduced the number of raions of Lviv Oblast to seven. The area of Zhovkva Raion was merged into Lviv Raion.

Dubliany is the birthplace of Polish painter Adam Werka, and long jumper Edward Czernik.

Among lost landmarks there was a cemetery chapel of Jan Alembek who was a Polonized German apothecary and trades and who for long period was a burgomaster (mayor) of Lwow (Lviv). To Alembek attested the first description of Lviv in Ukrainian Latin Alphabet.

References

External links 
 Dublany (2.) in the Geographical Dictionary of the Kingdom of Poland (1881)

Cities in Lviv Oblast
Cities of district significance in Ukraine
Lviv Raion